St John the Baptist's Church, Boylestone is a Grade II* listed  parish church in the Church of England in Boylestone, Derbyshire.

History

The church dates from the early 14th century. It was restored by Henry Duesbury when a new tower was added and reopened on Whit Tuesday 1844.

Parish status

The church is in a joint parish with 
St Michael and All Angel's Church, Church Broughton
All Saints' Church, Dalbury
St Chad's Church, Longford
Christ Church, Long Lane
St Andrew's Church, Radbourne
St Michael's Church, Sutton-on-the-Hill
All Saints’ Church, Trusley

See also
Grade II* listed buildings in Derbyshire Dales
Listed buildings in Boylestone

References

Church of England church buildings in Derbyshire
Grade II* listed churches in Derbyshire